Ensis is a genus of mollusks. It may also refer to:

 , Latin for sword
 The Ensis, a mythical sword represented by the star Eta Orionis in the constellation Orion